Cataclysme is a genus of moths in the family Geometridae.

Selected species
 Cataclysme dissimilata (Rambur, 1833)
 Cataclysme riguata (Hübner, [1813])
 Cataclysme shirniensis Ebert, 1965
 Cataclysme uniformata (Bellier, 1862)

References

Cataclysmiini
Moth genera